Marina Mališauskienė (née Kurkul, born 22 August 1966) is a Lithuanian chess player. She is two times winner of Lithuanian Women's Chess Championship (1985, 1993).

Biography 
Marina is student of Vilniaus fortas chess school and her trainer was Lithuanian chess master Vaidas Sakalauskas.

From 1981 to 1995, she participated regularly at the Lithuanian Women's Chess Championships and won five medals: 2 gold (1985, 1993), 2 silver (1983, 1991) and bronze (1987). In 1986, she shared 3rd-4th places, but lost the bronze medal in additional coefficient.

From 1996 to 2010 Marina did not participate in high-level chess tournaments. In 2011, she again took part in the Lithuanian Women's Chess Championship, and began to actively participate in team chess tournaments.

She is winner of Lithuanian Women's Team Chess Championship in 2015 (played on the 3rd board) as a member of the Forto club team.

Marina is wife of Lithuanian chess grandmaster Vidmantas Mališauskas.

References

External links 

1966 births
Living people
Lithuanian female chess players
Soviet female chess players